Koluszki railway station is a railway station in Koluszki, Łódź Voivodeship, Poland. As of 2022, it is served by Łódzka Kolej Aglomeracyjna (Lodz Metropolitan Railway), Przewozy Regionalne (Polregio) and PKP Intercity (EIP, InterCity, and TLK services).

Train services

The station is served by the following services:

 Intercity services (IC) Łódź Fabryczna — Warszawa Główna/Warszawa Wschodnia
 Intercity services (IC) Łódź Fabryczna — Warszawa — Lublin Główny
 Intercity services (IC) Łódź Fabryczna — Warszawa — Gdańsk Glowny — KołobrzegIntercity services (IC) Wrocław- Opole - Częstochowa - WarszawaKoleo. PKP IC 6124 FREDRO Wrocław Główny — Warszawa Wschodnia. Timetable. https://koleo.pl/pociag/IC/6124-FREDRO/
 Intercity services (IC) Wrocław - Ostrów Wielkopolski - Łódź - Warszawa Intercity services (IC) Zgorzelec - Legnica - Wrocław - Ostrów Wielkopolski - Łódź - WarszawaIntercity services (IC) Białystok - Warszawa - Częstochowa - Opole - WrocławIntercity services (IC) Białystok - Warszawa - Łódź - Ostrów Wielkopolski - WrocławIntercity services (IC) Ełk - Białystok - Warszawa - Łódź - Ostrów Wielkopolski - WrocławIntercity services (IC) Warszawa - Częstochowa - Katowice - Bielsko-BiałaIntercity services (IC) Białystok - Warszawa - Częstochowa - Katowice - Bielsko-BiałaIntercity services (IC) Olsztyn - Warszawa - Skierniewice - ŁódźIntercity services (IC) Olsztyn - Warszawa - Skierniewice - Częstochowa - Katowice - Bielsko-BiałaIntercity services (IC) Olsztyn - Warszawa - Skierniewice - Częstochowa - Katowice - Gliwice - RacibórzIntercity services (TLK) Warszawa - Częstochowa - Lubliniec - Opole - Wrocław - Szklarska Poręba GórnaIntercity services (TLK) Gdynia Główna — Kostrzyn 
Intercity services (TLK) Gdynia Główna — Warszawa — Krakow — Zakopane Koleo. PKP TLK 53104 MAŁOPOLSKA Gdynia Główna — Zakopane. Timetable. https://koleo.pl/en/pociag/TLK/53104-MA%C5%81OPOLSKA
 InterRegio services (IR) Łódź Fabryczna — Warszawa Glowna 
 InterRegio services (IR) Łódź Kaliska — Warszawa Glowna 
Regional services (PR) Łódź Fabryczna — Częstochowa 
 Regional services (PR) Łódź Kaliska — Częstochowa 
 Regional services (PR) Łódź Kaliska — Skarżysko-Kamienna 
Regional services (ŁKA) Łódz - SkierniewiceRegional services (ŁKA) Łódz - WarsawRegional services (ŁKA) Łódz - Tomaszów Mazowiecki - RadomRegional services (ŁKA) Łódz - Tomaszów Mazowiecki - Skarżysko-KamiennaRegional services (ŁKA) Łódz - Radomosko''

References 

Station article at Koleo.pl

Railway stations served by Przewozy Regionalne InterRegio
Railway stations in Poland opened in 1846